The Algerian Swimming Federation, is the national governing body for the sport of swimming in Algeria. It is a member of FINA, the international federation for swimming and other aquatic sports, as well as CANA (the African Swimming Confederation).

References

External links
  

National members of the African Swimming Confederation
Sports governing bodies in Algeria
Swimming in Algeria
1962 establishments in Algeria
Sports organizations established in 1962